Kuttiyum kolum is a traditional game played in Kerala, India. It is similar to an ancient game found all over the Indian Subcontinent with different names, such as Gilli-danda in North India. A similar game by the name of Lippa has been played in Italy. Kuttiyum kolum possibly originated over 2500 years ago.

Rules

The objective of the sport is to use the kolu like a baseball bat to strike the kutti (similar to striking a ball in cricket or baseball). For this purpose, a circle is drawn in the ground in which a small, oblong- or spindle-shaped hole is dug (in the shape of a traditional boat). This hole is smaller than the kutti but as the play progresses the size may increase due to wear.

The kutti is inserted into the hole either orthogonally, or at an angle. The danda is then swung (similar to a golf swing) and strikes the kutti. Another variation is when the kolu lifts or pries the kutti out of the hole at a high speed.

Scoring and outs
There are many regional variations to scoring.

One of the more popular ones is given below:

 A qualifier, called "kori kuthu" becomes the striker and places the kutti on the hole, and using the kolu lofts the kutti as far as they can. The kutti becomes airborne after it is lofted. If a fielder from the opposing team catches the kutti, the striker is out. If the kutti lands on the ground, the fielder closest to the kutti has one chance to hit the kolu ( with a throw (similar to a run out in cricket). If the fielder misses the kolu, the striker progresses to the next step.
 The striker then performs the "ittadi" (meaning drop and strike) where they hold kutti and kolu in the same hand, drop the kutti and strike at it before it reaches the ground. If the fielders catch the kutti, the striker goes out. If the kutti hits the ground, the fielder throws it back at the hole. The striker then hits the kutti again. The striker measures the distance from the point where the kutti lands, up to the hole, using the kolu in a straight line. If the measure is less than one length of the kolu, the striker is out.

The measuring sub-steps are: Saadu, Muri, Naazhi, Aytti and Aarenku. On measuring up to Aarenku, the striker counts one point and proceeds, starting with Saadu again. Depending on the sub-step at which the measure has ended, the striker strikes the kutti from different positions:
 Saadu — Places the kutti on the feet, tosses up and strikes with the kolu.
 Muri — (easy) drops the kutti from one hand and strikes with the kolu.
 Naazhi — Places the kutti on the back of the palm with middle and ring fingers bent inwards, tosses up the kutti and strikes with the kolu.
 Aytti — drops the kutti from the elbow and strikes with the kolu.
 Aarenku — (difficult) Closes an eye, places the kutti over it, drops it and strikes with the kolu.

From "ittadi" onwards, the striker gets points depending on how far he can strike the kutti back, when the fielder throws back.

Teams
There is no official limit on the number of players in kuttiyum kolum and grouped into two teams. Kuttiyum kolum can be played where each individual plays for themselves, or between two teams.
Reward/Punishment:
The victor has the privilege to impose sanction called a Kidu on the looser. The mode of Kidu may be decided before the game started. For example in ottayadium kiduvum, the looser has to run without breaking breath ( indicated by the break in the repeat of a breathless kidu..kidu..kidu..) all the distance covered by one easy 'adi' like the *Muri[(easy) drops the kutti from one hand and strikes with the kolu] mentioned above. In case the looser 'broke the breath', from that spot the victor can repeat an ittadi or muri!

References

Traditional sports of India
Sports originating in India
Culture of Kerala
Sport in Kerala